The Russian Night School of Baltimore was a night school that served the educational needs of Russian and Eastern European Jewish immigrants living in Baltimore. Located at 1208 East Baltimore Street, the school was founded by the Zionist activist Henrietta Szold. The school was open for a decade, closing in 1898 after the City of Baltimore agreed to open public night schools for immigrants. 5,000 students were educated at the Russian Night School. The school left a lasting impression on American education, being an early example of an educational institution offering English as a Second Language (ESL) classes.

See also
History of the Jews in Baltimore
History of Russians in Baltimore

References

External links

1889 establishments in Maryland
1898 disestablishments in Maryland
Jewish schools in the United States
Jonestown, Baltimore
Organizations established in 1889
Russian international schools in the United States
Russian-Jewish culture in Baltimore
Schools of English as a second or foreign language